Red Hot TV is a Canadian English language Category B specialty channel that broadcasts adult entertainment material, primarily consisting of pornographic films, with a focus on couples-oriented programming sourced from various adult film studios including original Canadian content. The channel is owned by Ten Broadcasting, a company owned by Stuart Duncan (80.01%) and LFP Video Inc. (19.9%).

History
In December 2000, Ten Broadcasting Inc. was granted approval by the Canadian Radio-television and Telecommunications Commission (CRTC) to launch a television channel called TEN – Channel 2, described as "a national English-language Category 2 specialty television service devoted to adult entertainment programming, including adult entertainment films, talk shows, phone-in shows and other programming on the theme of sexuality."

The channel was launched on December 1, 2003 on Rogers Cable as X Channel. In 2006, the channel was renamed Red Light District TV. The channel was once again renamed, this time on August 1, 2008 as Red Hot TV.

Theme nights

Monday: Red Hot Gone Wild
Tuesday Nights: Foreign Nights
Wednesday Nights: Amateur Nights
Thursday Nights: Titty Nights
Red Hot Fridays
Sunday Nights: Red Hot Classics

Slogans
 On weekday To Now Up Is Hot  
 "Turn Up The Heat"
 "Life is Red Hot"

Logos

References

External links
  (Note: adult content)

Canadian pornographic television channels
Television channels and stations established in 2003
Digital cable television networks in Canada
English-language television stations in Canada
Commercial-free television networks
2003 establishments in Canada